Worzel Gummidge Down Under is a New Zealand-British television series adapted from the books written by Barbara Euphan Todd and the British fantasy series television programme produced and broadcast in the United Kingdom named Worzel Gummidge, starring Jon Pertwee. The story continued in New Zealand when Aunt Sally was sold to a museum owner.

Cast
Jon Pertwee as Worzel Gummidge
Bruce Phillips as The Crowman
Jonny Marks as Mickey
Olivia Ihimaera-Smiler as Manu
Una Stubbs as Aunt Sally
Wi Kuki Kaa as Travelling Scarecrow Maker
Maria James as Eloise

Episodes

Series 1
"As the Scarecrow Flies" (4 October 1987)
"The Sleeping Beauty" (11 October 1987)
"Full Employment" (18 October 1987)
"Worzel's Handicap" (25 October 1987)
"King of the Scarecrows" (1 November 1987)
"Ten Heads Are Better Than One " (8 November 1987)
"Worzel to the Rescue" (15 November 1987)
"Slave Scarecrow" (22 November 1987)
"The Traveller Unmasked" (29 November 1987)
"A Friend in Need" (6 December 1987)

Series 2
"Stage Struck" (29 January 1989)
"A Red Sky in T'Morning" (5 February 1989)
"Them Thar Hills" (12 February 1989)
"The Beauty Contest" (19 February 1989)
"Balbous Cauliflower" (26 February 1989)
"Weevily Swede" (5 March 1989)
"Elementary My Dear Worty" (12 March 1989)
"Dreams of Avarish" (19 March 1989)
"The Runaway Train" (26 March 1989)
"Aunt Sally, R.A." (2 April 1989)
"Wattle Hearthbrush" (9 April 1989)
"The Bestest Scarecrow" (16 April 1989)

DVD release
 Worzel Gummidge UltimateSeries 1–4, Christmas Special, and Down UnderRegion 2 (UK)

References

External links
 

1987 British television series debuts
1989 British television series endings
New Zealand children's television series
Channel 4 comedy
British children's comedy television series
Television shows based on children's books
1980s New Zealand television series
1987 New Zealand television series debuts
1989 New Zealand television series endings